Wilhelm Friedrich Carl Philipp Albert Nikolaus Erich Maria Herzog von Württemberg (born 13 August 1994) is the head of the House of Württemberg and a German businessperson.  He is Chair of the Hofkammer des Hauses Württemberg, the company which manages the forests, farms, wineries, and housing estates of the former royal family of the Kingdom of Württemberg.

Life

Wilhelm is the eldest child of Friedrich, Hereditary Duke of Württemberg (1961–2018) and Princess Marie Wilhelmine of Wied (born 1973).  He was baptised in September 1994  with his uncles Erich, Prince of Waldburg zu Zeil und Trauchburg, and Prince Wilhelm of Wied, as his godfathers. He has two younger sisters, Duchess Marie Amelie (born 1996) and Duchess Sophie Dorothee (born 1997).

On 9 May 2018, Wilhelm's father died in a car accident while driving on his way home to Friedrichshafen.  Upon the death of his father, Wilhelm became the heir apparent to his grandfather, Carl, Duke of Württemberg as Head of the House of Württemberg. In July 2019 it was also announced that Wilhelm would be the future head of the Württemberg Hofkammer, the administrative offices of the family business.

On 7 June 2022 Wilhelm succeeded as Head of the House of Württemberg upon the death of his grandfather, Carl, Duke of Württemberg. 

Wilhelm is unmarried. The heir presumptive to the headship of the House is Wilhelm's paternal uncle Prince Eberhard of Württemberg.

References

1994 births
Living people
Pretenders to the throne of Württemberg
People from Ravensburg
Dukes of Württemberg (titular)